Pseudoprotapion astragali is a species of beetles belonging to the family Apionidae.

It is native to Europe.

Synonym:
 Apion astragali (Paykull, 1800)

References

Brentidae